Prenda is a monotypic butterfly genus of subfamily Satyrinae in the family Nymphalidae. Its one species Prenda clarissa is found in the Neotropical realm.

The generic name Prenda "designates a young woman from Rio Grande do Sul, one of the States from where type specimens were obtained. Prenda is therefore used here in a figurative sense in honor of this well-regarded folklore figure." The specific name "refers to Clarissa, a main character and also the title of the first novel of Érico Veríssimo".

References

Euptychiina
Fauna of Brazil
Nymphalidae of South America
Monotypic butterfly genera